Sorbets may refer to the following places in France:

Sorbets, Gers, a commune in the Gers department 
Sorbets, Landes, a commune in the Landes department